John David Charles Sussex is a British philatelist who signed the Roll of Distinguished Philatelists in 2009.

References

British philatelists
Signatories to the Roll of Distinguished Philatelists
Living people
Year of birth missing (living people)